Dohassen Gault-Williams (born June 29, 1974), better known as Das Williams, is an American politician who currently serves as County Supervisor on the Santa Barbara County Board of Supervisors. He represents the First District, which encompasses Carpinteria, most of Santa Barbara, and parts of the Los Padres National Forest. He formerly served in the California State Assembly, representing the 37th district, encompassing parts of Santa Barbara and Ventura counties. Prior to being elected to the state assembly, he was a member of the Santa Barbara City Council. He is a Democrat.

Background
Das led the effort to pass a new gun control measure after the 2014 Isla Vista shootings, similar policies have since been adopted nationwide. After the Thomas Fire and Montecito Debris flow Das was instrumental in passing ordinances that allowed homeowners to rebuild their lost property quickly.

Before embarking in politics, Williams worked as a junior high school teacher and a legislative aide to then-assemblymember Hannah-Beth Jackson.

Williams holds a master's degree in Environmental Science & Management, with a focus on water pollution, planning processes, and land-use law from the University of California, Santa Barbara's Bren School of Environmental Science & Management in 2005. As a UC grad, Williams has opposed fee increases for the UC system.

2014 California State Assembly

References

External links 
 
 

1974 births
California city council members
American community activists
Living people
Democratic Party members of the California State Assembly
People from Alaska
People from Santa Barbara, California
University of California, Santa Barbara alumni
People from Carpinteria, California
21st-century American politicians